Quill (foaled 1956 in Kentucky) was an American Thoroughbred racehorse who was the 1958 Champion Two-Year-Old Filly in the United States.

Racing career
Quill was the first Champion for future U.S. and Canadian Hall of Fame trainer Lucien Laurin. In her 1958 championship year Quill's major wins came in the Gardenia Stakes at New Jersey's Garden State Park and the Matron Stakes at Belmont Park in New York.

Broodmare
Following her retirement from racing Quill became a successful broodmare.

Bred to the 20th Century's most influential stallion Northern Dancer, a winner of the 1964 Kentucky Derby and Preakness Stakes, Quill was the dam of the 1966 colt One For All whose stakes wins included the Canadian International Championship, Laurel Turf Cup Handicap, Pan American Handicap, Sunset Handicap and the Niagara Handicap.

In 1971 Quill was bred to Northern Dancer's son, the 1970 English Triple Crown winner Nijinsky. That match produced the 1972 foal Caucasus who won the Irish St Leger before being sent to compete in North America. There, his stakes wins included the Arcadia, Manhattan, San Luis Rey and Sunset Handicaps.

Pedigree

References

External links
 Quill's pedigree and partial racing stats

1956 racehorse births
Racehorses bred in Kentucky
Racehorses trained in the United States
American Champion racehorses
Thoroughbred family 5-g